Edith Frost is an eponymously titled EP by Edith Frost, released on June 17, 1996 through Drag City.

Track listing

Personnel 
Edith Frost – vocals, guitar
Bill Neubauer – guitar on "My God Insane"

References

External links 
 

1996 EPs
Drag City (record label) EPs
Edith Frost albums